Ralph Taylor may refer to:

 Ralph Taylor (ice hockey) (1905–1976), ice hockey player
 Ralph Taylor (politician) (1773–1847), merchant and political figure in Lower Canada
 Ralph Taylor (archer) (1874–1958), American archer
 Ralph Taylor (footballer) (1915–2012), Australian rules footballer
 Ralph Taylor (divine) (1647-1722), English non-juroring clergyman